Lonely Side of the City is the fourth and final studio album by the 1960s soul and pop group The American Breed, released in the fall of 1968. For their last album, the group decided to move more towards a soft rock approach. However, the group had all but fallen out of favor with the music public, and the album failed miserably. "Walls" was the only single released from the album, and, after releasing several more non-album singles, including the last official American Breed single, "Can't Make It Without You" (1970), the group officially disbanded, and later reorganized as soul/funk band Rufus.

Track listing
"Always You"  (Tony Asher, Roger Nichols) – (2:12)
"Love is Just a State of Mind" (Al Ciner) – (2:43)
"New Games to Play" (Peter Andreoli, Ritchie Cordell, Vini Poncia) – (2:21)
"Walls" (Gary Loizzo) – (2:30)
"I've Got to Get You Off My Mind" (Loizzo) – (2:21)
"To Put Up With You" (Paul Williams, Nichols) – (2:30)
"Another Bad Morning" (Jerry Harris, Paul Kaufman) – (2:55)
"What Can You Do When You're Lonely" (Ciner) – (3:10)
"River of No Regrets" (Chuck Colbert) – (3:11)
"Partners in Life" (Bill Carr, Tony Powers) – (3:06)
"Out in the Cold Again" (Dick Monda, Keith Colley) – (2:39)

Personnel

The American Breed
 Gary Loizzo – lead vocals, lead guitar, organ
 Chuck Colbert – bass
 Al Ciner – twelve string guitar
 Lee Graziano – drums, trumpet

Technical
 Bill Traut, Skeet Bushor, The American Breed – producers
 Eddie Higgins, Bob Schiff, Jim Vincent – assistant producers
 Jerry DeClercq – engineer
 Christopher Whorf – art direction
 Susan McCartney – photography

References

External links
 Lonely Side of the City at Discogs

1968 albums
The American Breed albums
Albums produced by Al Ciner
Albums produced by Kevin Murphy (musician)